XHHE may refer to:

 XHHE-FM, a radio station (106.9 FM) in Atotonilco El Alto, Jalisco, Mexico
 XHHE-TDT, a television station (channel 25, virtual 1) in Ciudad Acuña, Coahuila, Mexico